Otocinclus mura is a species of catfish in the family Loricariidae. It is native to South America, where it is known only from the Amazon River basin in Brazil. It is a small loricariid, although it is not particularly small when compared with other Otocinclus species, reaching 3.6 cm (1.4 inches) SL. While it is known to appear in the aquarium trade, it does not have a widely used common name.

References 

Hypoptopomatini